Kordie is a department or commune of Sanguié Province in central Burkina Faso. Its capital lies at the town of Kordie.

References

Departments of Burkina Faso
Sanguié Province